Deutsche Woolworth GmbH & Company OHG (commonly known as Woolworth Deutschland or Woolworth GmbH) is a chain of department stores in Germany and was a former subsidiary of the American F. W. Woolworth Company. As of 2022 the chain has 530 stores in Germany and is aiming to have over 1,000 in the medium term and over 5,000 across Europe in the long term.

It was not part of the closure scheme that affected the British Woolworths Group stores, nor is it related to the Australian-based Woolworths Group retail group.

History
F. W. Woolworth Co. GmbH was founded in 1927 with its first store in Bremen and was a subsidiary of the American company F. W. Woolworth Company. When still part of the parent company, corporate documents refer to the division as Retail Company of Germany, Inc..

In 1968 new company headquarters opened in Frankfurt which served as the HQ for the brand until 2010.

The German subsidiary separated from its American parent company in 1998, through a management buyout and the company was officially renamed to "DWW Deutsche Woolworth GmbH & Co. OHG." (It continued trading as Woolworth)

In 2005 the brand opened its 330th store in Germany.

In October 2007, the British investment and consulting company Argyll Partners along with the US financial investor Cerberus Capital Management bought the company.

On the 11th of April 2009, Woolworth GmbH board of directors voted to declare insolvency as the chain was squeezed between discounters and more specialist retailers. 23 branches were taken over by the NKD store chain. By the end of August the Federal Cartel Office approved the acquisition of 71 Woolworth stores by the Schlecker retail chain. In September Woolworth started operating as 162 store chain down from 310. During the insolvency the Austrian branches were separated from the German chain in October and bought by bluO an Austrian financial investor, 9 of the 12 stores were later rebranded to Adler and the others closed.

In 2010 Woolworth was sold to HH Holding a subsidiary of the Tengelmann Group (which owns KiK and OBI) and by July 1 the headquarters had moved from Frankfurt to Unna. By the end of 2011 the store number had risen to over 200.

In February 2016 the chain opened its 300th branch in Dortmund city centre.

On Thursday October 31, the 400th store opened in Bielefeld, the store is 2,000 square meters in size and on opening day was very popular with at the 9am opening people rushed into the store and there were long queues.

In September October 2020 the new headquarters opened in Unna located in the Unna/Kamen industrial park, it includes a distribution centre and is over 180,000 square meters, when it opened the complex had around 450 staff and will eventually have over 1,000 staff.

Woolworth did not close any stores during the Covid-19 Pandemic and remained relatively unscathed and opened over 100 stores since the start of 2020.

During Autumn 2021 the company started working with ImmoScout24 a real estate platform to help find spaces where new stores would do well.

In October 2022 Woolworth announced that it sees potential for more than 1,000 locations in the medium term and announced that the chain would expand to Poland in May 2023, it was also stated that the chain had experienced immense financial growth and was becoming more popular due to the cost of living crisis.

Sustainability 
Since 2016, Woolworth has stopped using environmentally harmful plastic shopping bags and instead uses reusable, PET and paper bags. During the opening of new stores and renovation of old stores new energy efficient LED lights are installed.

The headquarters in Unna generates some of its own electricity and heat via a combined heat and power plant. Woolworth uses the principle of core activation to regulate temperature through the buildings.

External links
 Deutsche Woolworth

References

Department stores of Germany
Retail companies established in 1927
F. W. Woolworth Company